Delecour is a French surname. Notable people with the surname include:

 François Delecour (born 1962), French rally driver
 Jocelyn Delecour (born 1935), French sprinter

See also
 De la Cour

French-language surnames